Luthersburg is an unincorporated community in Clearfield County, Pennsylvania, United States. Luthersburg has a post office, with ZIP code 15848.

The community was named for W. H. Luther, an early settler.

References

Unincorporated communities in Clearfield County, Pennsylvania
Unincorporated communities in Pennsylvania